The Plan of San Diego  was drafted in San Diego, Texas, in 1915 by a group of unidentified Mexican and Tejano rebels who hoped to seize Arizona, New Mexico, California, and Texas from the United States.  "It is called for a general uprising, scheduled for February 20, 1915, and the assassination of every non Latin male over 16 years of age-the strike are to include all of South Texas. Germans were excluded from the killings, and shortly thereafter the infamous Zimmermann Note disclosed German efforts to involve Mexico and American in war, thereby diverting American aid to the allies.  The San Diego Plan was part of the plot, which collapsed immediately on discovery".  (Source: Syers, Ed, Backroads of Texas, 1914, Copyright 1979).

The goal of the plan is debated. The plan stated a supposed "attempt to overthrow the government in the Southern United States." However, some theories state that the true goal of the plan was to create the conditions to force the US to support one of the factions of the Mexican Revolution, as eventually occurred.

The plan called for the killing of all adult white American men in the Southwestern states and the "return of land to Mexicans." It was, however, exposed before it could be fully executed. Although there was no uprising, there were raids into Texas that began in July 1915. The raids were countered by Texas Rangers, the U.S. Army and local self-defense groups. In total, 30 raids into Texas destroyed large amounts of property and killed 21 Americans. It is not known who was responsible for drafting the Plan of San Diego, but there are theories that Mexican revolutionary leaders helped to sponsor it.

Background
During the Mexican Revolution, the Porfirio Díaz government fought with rebellious factions from 1910 onward. The fighting caused some rebels to flee from the Díaz government to the U.S., especially to Texas. The Mexican dissidents upset the political order of South Texas and caused the state government to worry about the area's Mexican majority. The Plan of San Diego grew out of that social unrest.

Content
Declaring the creation of a Liberating Army of Races and Peoples, the Plan of San Diego called for the recruitment of Mexican nationals, Native Americans and Mexican Americans to rebel against the United States. The central goal of the plan was to "free Texas, New Mexico, Arizona, California, and Colorado from U.S. control" (see Reconquista). These states would become an independent republic that in the future could be reunited with Mexico. To the north, rebels hoped to conquer other states to produce a buffer zone between the United States and Mexico.
 
On February 20, 1915, the plan was called for starting the execution of "North American" men over the age of 16; only the elderly as well as women and children were to be spared. Also executed would be Mexican Americans who refused to participate in the plan. A notable provision of the plan was the protection of Native Americans, with native land being returned to them.

The plan was penned in San Diego, Texas, but it was actually signed by rebels inside a jail cell in Monterrey, Mexico. Although their identities and motivations remain unknown, there is much speculation as to who was responsible.

On February 20, when the plan was supposed to be enacted, rebel leaders revised the plan to focus solely on the liberation of Texas, which would become a base from which advance the revolution throughout the Southwestern United States.

Theories

Huertistas
One theory is that Victoriano Huerta, a leader of a Mexican faction vying for governmental control in the Mexican Revolution, was the mastermind behind the plan. The theory rests on the capture of Huertista Basilio Ramos in Brownsville, Texas, in January 1915. In his possession was a copy of the Plan of San Diego. Under interrogation in jail in Monterrey, he admitted to signing the plan, along with eight Huertista cellmates. A jailer had supposedly smuggled in a copy of the plan to give to the inmates. Ramos credited the creation of the plan to another unnamed Huertista, who hoped to reconquer the Southwestern United States to gain domestic support in Mexico for Huerta.

Carrancistas

Another theory states that the Mexican government under Venustiano Carranza, who became president of Mexico in 1914, supported the drafting of the Plan of San Diego in order to exploit the tension between Tejanos and white Americans inside southern Texas. Although the plan explicitly stated that there would be no aid from the Mexican government, the Carranza government was actually crucial in keeping the plan in action. Some believe that Carranza wanted to exacerbate conflict between Americans and Mexicans in Texas to force the United States to recognize him as the true leader of Mexico, as ultimately happened.

Raids

The first raids under the Plan of San Diego were conducted in July 1915, five months after the agreed start date of February 20. The first raids targeted Mexican Americans who were prominent in agriculture and local town politics in Texas. On July 11, at the Magnolia dance ground in Brownsville, raiders shot and killed Tejano deputy Pablo Falcon, the first victim of the Plan of San Diego. One of the raiders was Ignacio Cantu, a Mexican who had been arrested by Falcon a week earlier.

As raids grew in number, the "high tide" of the Plan of San Diego was August and September 1915. The raids during this period were led by cousins Aniceto Pizana and Luis de la Rosa, well-known residents of South Texas. The latter, according to Clair Kenamore of the St. Louis Post-Dispatch, was born in Brownsville and was a former deputy sheriff.  The raids were conducted in the style of guerrilla warfare, with the overall purpose of razing U.S. public and private property. 
 
De la Rosa and Pizana created small bands, somewhat like military companies, constructed of 25 to 100 men. The Rio Grande Valley was the focus of the raids where trains were fired upon and telegraph wires and poles were cut down. On August 8, nearly 60 raiders struck the Norias Ranch, leaving five men dead when chased by American forces. U.S. authorities learned from this raid and from the wounded left behind that support from the Mexican Carranza government supplied the raiders, half of the men being Mexican citizens.
  
Mexican support was crucial in keeping the offensive alive when the plan was enacted. Mexico supplied half of the men on guerrilla missions and even used Mexican newspapers as propaganda in the border towns, where they exaggerated the success of Mexicans against white Americans and urged further participation.

U.S. reaction
The raids and the propaganda, as well as white Texans' general fear, prompted authorities to send federal troops and Texas Rangers, who struggled to counter the raids. Eventually, on October 19, 1915, President Woodrow Wilson, as urged to by his staff to appease Carranza, officially recognized Carranza as the legitimate leader of Mexico. Then, Carranza used his armies to assist the Americans in capturing and imprisoning raiders, which ended the high tide of the Plan of San Diego.

White Americans became increasingly hostile and suspicious of Mexican Americans both during and after the Plan of San Diego raids. Small personal conflicts between Mexican Americans and white Americans led to the lynching and the execution of Mexicans by Texas Rangers, local officers and law enforcement, and civilians. Local whites founded the vigilante Law and Order League in 1915, fueled by suspicions of Mexican and Tejano insurrection. Federal officials estimated that from late 1915 to 1916, more than 300 Mexican Americans were slain in Texas. The 1919 Canales investigation into misconduct by the Texas Rangers estimated that from 1914 to 1919, between 300 and 5,000 ethnic Mexicans were killed by American law enforcement personnel engaged in suppressing the raids.

About 400 Anglo-Texans were killed in total during raids from Mexico along the border during the 1910s, and much property was destroyed.

The Americans thought that German agents may have been involved as well, but no evidence has been uncovered. Threats of Mexican reconquest, however, reminiscent of the Plan of San Diego, reappeared in Germany's Zimmermann Telegram of 1917, which helped push the United States into war with Germany during the First World War.

Aftermath
In March 1916, Mexican revolutionary Pancho Villa raided Columbus, New Mexico. In response, the American government sent the Pancho Villa Expedition deep into Mexico to catch him. It failed to do so, but the Mexican government responded to U.S. forces entering Mexico by resuming raids northward. The crisis escalated to the verge of formal war but was resolved by diplomacy. Carranza was the driving force behind the resurgence of raids.

See also
Bandit War
La Matanza (1910–1920)
Mexican–American War
Pancho Villa Expedition
Zimmermann Telegram

References

Further reading
 Gómez-Quiñones, Juan. "Plan de San Diego Reviewed," Aztlan, (1970) 1#1 pp 124–132
 Johnson, Benjamin H. "Unearthing the Hidden Histories of a Borderlands Rebellion," Journal of South Texas (Spring 2011) 24#1 pp 6–21
 Katz, Friedrich. The Secret War in Mexico: Europe, the United States and the Mexican Revolution (University of Chicago Press, 1981). 
 Sandos, James, Rebellion in the Borderlands: Anarchism and the Plan of San Diego 1904–1923, University of Oklahoma Press (1992)

Primary sources
 text of Plan
 

History of Mexico
1915 in the United States
History of the American West
Invasions of the United States
Plans in Mexico
1915 documents
Tejano
Ethnic cleansing in the United States